This is a list of slums in Bangladesh.

 Begun Bari
 Bhola (Dhaka North)
 City Palli (Dhaka South)
 Driver Colony (Dhaka South)
 Duaripara (Dhaka North)
 Kawnia
 Korail slum (Dhaka North)
 Lalbagh (Slum)|Lalbagh
 Mach Colony
 Mannan (Dhaka South)
 Mohammadpur (Slum)|Mohammadpur
 Molla (Dhaka North)
 Monsur Beel / Nama Para 
 Mymensingh (Slum)|Mymensingh
 Nubur (Dhaka South)
 Power House (Dhaka South)
 Pura (Dhaka South)
 Rail Line slums

See also

 List of slums

References

External links
https://web.archive.org/web/20130228083635/http://www.isuh.org/download/dhaka.pdf

Slums
Bangladesh
Slums in Asia